Gowyjeh Qomlaq (also Romanized as Gowjeh Qomlāq; also known as Gojeh Ghomlagh and Gowyjeh Qandāq) is a village in Qaranqu Rural District, in the Central District of Hashtrud County, East Azerbaijan Province, Iran. At the 2006 census, its population was 156, in 29 families.

References 

Towns and villages in Hashtrud County